Charles Adler may refer to:

 Charles Adler (broadcaster) (born 1954), Canadian broadcaster
 Charlie Adler (born 1956), American voice actor
 Frederick Charles Adler (1889–1959), usually known as F. Charles Adler, English-German conductor
 Charles Adler Jr. (1899–1980), American inventor
 Charles Adler (entrepreneur), co-founder of Kickstarter

See also
 Adler (surname)